The One is the twenty-third studio album by British recording artist Elton John, released on 22 June 1992. It was recorded at Studio Guillaume Tell in Paris, produced by Chris Thomas and managed by John Reid. The album was dedicated to Vance Buck, and its cover artwork was designed by Gianni Versace.

The One spent three consecutive weeks at No. 2 without reaching No. 1 in the UK, being kept off the top spot by the Lionel Richie compilation Back to Front. However, it was John's biggest-selling album in the US since 1976, and was certified 2× platinum in that country by the RIAA. It is also John's only studio album to reach number one in Germany.

Background
Olle Romö collaborated with John and lyricist Bernie Taupin on one song, "Runaway Train", in which Eric Clapton sang a duet with John. Pink Floyd's David Gilmour also made an appearance, playing guitar on "Understanding Women". John's long-standing drummer Nigel Olsson and female backing vocalist Kiki Dee (who had duetted with John on his hit single "Don't Go Breaking My Heart") and longtime guitarist Davey Johnstone provided backing vocals on a few songs.

The One was John's first album project since his rehabilitation from drug and alcohol addictions and bulimia in 1990. On the album, he returned to playing an acoustic piano (a Yamaha Disklavier) in place of the Roland RD-1000 digital piano that had featured heavily on the previous albums Reg Strikes Back (1988) and Sleeping with the Past (1989), although he did use the RD-1000 again during the tour for the album (as documented on Live In Barcelona) and on his later album Duets (1993).

Track listing
All songs composed by Elton John and Bernie Taupin, except "Runaway Train", co-written by Olle Romö.

Personnel 
 Elton John – vocals, acoustic piano (1-3, 5–8, 11), organ (4, 5), electric piano (9, 10)
 Mark Taylor – keyboards (1–3, 6, 7)
 Guy Babylon – keyboards (2–5, 7–11), programming (2–5, 7–11)
 Adam Seymour – guitar (1, 2, 6, 7)
 Davey Johnstone – guitar (2–5, 7–9), backing vocals (7, 9)
 Eric Clapton – guitar (4), vocals (4)
 David Gilmour – guitar (10)
 Pino Palladino – bass (1–8, 10)
 Olle Romo – drums (1-10), percussion (1-10), drum programming (1–10)
 Beckie Bell – backing vocals (4)
 Carole Fredericks – backing vocals (4)
 Jonice Jamison – backing vocals (4)
 Kiki Dee – backing vocals (7, 9, 10)
 Nigel Olsson – backing vocals (7, 9)

Production 
 Produced by Chris Thomas
 Recorded and Engineered by David Nicholas
 Assistant Engineers – Alex Firla and Andy Strange
 Assistant Engineer on "Runaway Train" – Andy Bradfield
 Tracks #1–3, 5–9 & 11 recorded at Studio Guillaume Tell (Paris, France).
 "Runaway Train" recorded at Studio Guillaume Tell and The Town House (London, England).
 "Understanding Women" recorded at Air Studios (London).
 Mixed at Air Studios
 Cutting at The Hit Factory London.
 Album Coordination – Steve Brown
 Studio Coordination – Adrian Collee and Sam Stell
Technician to Eric Clapton – Lee Dixon
 Technician to Mark Taylor – Vince Barker
 Photography – Patrick Dermarchelier
 Cover Design Concept – Gianni Versace
 Management – John Reid

Charts

Weekly charts

Year-end charts

Certifications

References

External links

Elton John albums
1992 albums
Albums produced by Chris Thomas (record producer)
The Rocket Record Company albums